This is a partial list of famous Czech people. This list includes people born in Czech lands, people of the Czech nationality as well as people having some significant Czech ancestry or association with Czech culture.

Note: If you wish to add a name to this list, first add it here instead: Biography Stub Factory. This prevents the list from succumbing to a large amount of "red links".

Actors
See Czech actors
Lída Baarová
Jiří Bartoška
Vlasta Burian
Anna Geislerová
Nataša Gollová
Jiří Grossmann
Miroslav Horníček
Rudolf Hrušínský
Zorka Janů
Petr Kostka
Herbert Lom
Adina Mandlová
Vladimír Menšík
Gustav Nezval
David Nykl
Anny Ondra (Anna Ondráková)
Karel Roden
Libuše Šafránková
Jan Tříska
Tatiana Vilhelmová
Eduard Vojan
Jiří Voskovec
Jan Werich
Stella Zázvorková

Architects and designers

Jan Santini Aichel
Matthias of Arras
Jakub Bursa
Josef Chochol
Kilian Ignaz Dientzenhofer
Alois Dryák
Josef Gočár
Josef Hoffmann
Eva Jiřičná
František Maxmilián Kaňka
Jan Kaplický
Jan Kotěra
Zdeněk Kovář
Jakub Krčín
Jaromír Krejcar
Adolf Loos
Josef Mocker
Štěpánek Netolický
Balthasar Neumann
Josef Niklas
Joseph Maria Olbrich
Peter Parler
Milada Petříková-Pavlíková
Bořek Šípek

Authors and poets
See Czech writers

Michal Ajvaz
Jindřich Šimon Baar
Jan Blahoslav
Karel Havlíček Borovský
Max Brod
Otokar Březina
Karel Čapek
Svatopluk Čech
František Čelakovský
Cosmas of Prague
Jakub Deml
Ivan Diviš
Jaroslav Durych
Viktor Dyk
Marie von Ebner-Eschenbach
Karel Jaromír Erben
Jaroslav Foglar
Julius Fučík
Ladislav Fuks
František Gellner
Jaroslav Hašek
Vladimír Holan
Miroslav Holub
Bohumil Hrabal
Václav Hrabě
František Hrubín
Petr Hruška
Miroslav Ivanov
Boleslav Jablonský
Josef Jedlička
Milena Jesenská
Alois Jirásek
Franz Kafka
Václav Kaplický
Egon Kisch
Václav Kliment Klicpera
Pavel Kohout
Václav Kosmák
Karl Kraus
Jan Křesadlo
Karel Kryl
Milan Kundera
František Langer
Bohuslav z Lobkovic
Arnošt Lustig
Karel Hynek Mácha
Petr Maděra
Jiří Mahen
Rudolf Medek
Ondřej Neff
Vladimír Neff
Božena Němcová
Jan Neruda
Vítězslav Nezval
Ota Pavel
Ferdinand Peroutka
Eduard Petiška
Otfried Preussler
Bohuslav Reynek
Rainer Maria Rilke
John of Rokycan (Jan Rokycana)
Karel Sabina
Jaroslav Seifert
Jan Skácel
Josef Škvorecký
Adalbert Stifter
Tom Stoppard
Zdeněk Svěrák
Karel Teige
Jáchym Topol
Jan Matzal Troska
Josef Kajetán Tyl
Miloš Urban
Josef Váchal
Vladislav Vančura
Michal Viewegh
Jaroslav Vrchlický
Franz Werfel
Jan Werich
Ivan Wernisch
Zikmund Winter
Jiří Wolker
Jan Zábrana
Jan Zahradníček
Vojtech Zamarovský
Julius Zeyer

Composers
See Czech composers

Ralph Benatzky
František Benda
Jiří Antonín Benda
Karel Bendl
Heinrich Ignaz Franz Biber 
Vilém Blodek
Pavel Borkovec
František Xaver Brixi
Bohuslav Černohorský
Alexander Dreyschock
František Xaver Dušek 
Jan Ladislav Dusík
Antonín Dvořák
Josef Fiala
Zdeněk Fibich
Josef Bohuslav Foerster
Vladimír Franz
Julius Fučík
Pavel Haas
Alois Hába
Jan Hammer
Jan Hanuš
Kryštof Harant z Polžic a Bezdružic
Ilja Hurník
Leoš Janáček
Otakar Jeremiáš
Jaroslav Ježek
Karel Boleslav Jirák
Vojtěch Jírovec (also known as Adalbert Gyrowetz)
Václav Kaprál
Vítězslava Kaprálová
Rudolf Karel
Erich Wolfgang Korngold
Petr Kotík
Jan Antonín Koželuh
Leopold Koželuh
Hans Krása (Jewish)
Ernst Krenek
Jan Křtitel Krumpholtz
Jan Kubelík
Rafael Kubelík
Ladislav Kubík
Jan Křtitel Kuchař (also known as Johann Baptist Kucharz)
Jiří Ignác Linek
Gustav Mahler (Jewish)
Bohuslav Martinů
František Míča
Adam Václav Michna z Otradovic
Oskar Morawetz
Josef Mysliveček
Oskar Nedbal
Jan Novák
Vítězslav Novák
Antonín Rejcha
František Xaver Richter (Franz Xaver Richter)
Jan Jakub Ryba
Ervín Schulhoff (Jewish)
Josef Seger
František Škroup
Bedřich Smetana
Anton Stamitz (Cz. Stamic) (half-German)
Karel Stamitz (Cz. Stamic) (half-German)
Johann Stamitz (Cz. Stamic)
Josef Suk
Karel Svoboda
Viktor Ullmann
Dalibor Cyril Vačkář
Jaromír Vejvoda
Jan Václav Voříšek
Pavel Vranický (also known as Paul Wranitzky)
Ladislav Vycpálek
Johann Baptist Wanhal (Jan Ignatius Vaňhal)
Jan Zach
Jan Dismas Zelenka
Otakar Zich

Other musicians
See Czech musicians

Karel Ančerl, conductor
Jiří Bělohlávek, conductor
Gabriela Beňačková, opera singer
Alfred Brendel, pianist
Ema Destinnová, opera singer
Ewa Farna, pop singer
Michaela Fukačová, cellist
Karel Gott, singer
Alice Herz-Sommer, pianist
Maria Jeritza, opera singer
Jiří Jirmal, guitarist
Markéta Irglová, singer, actress, Oscar prize winner
Mikolas Josef, pop singer
Gabriela Gunčíková, pop singer
Martina Bárta, pop singer
Marta Jandová, pop singer
Vaclav Noid Barta, pop singer
Tomas Kalnoky, singer, guitarist and composer
Karel Kovařovic, conductor
Magdalena Kožená, opera singer
Antonín Kraft, cellist
Ivan Kral, guitarist and singer
Karel Kryl, songwriter
Jan Kubelík, violinist
Daniel Landa, singer
Aneta Langerová, singer
Ferdinand Laub, violinist
Jan Antonín Losy, lute player
Waldemar Matuška, singer-songwriter and actor
Ivan Moravec, pianist
Ignaz Moscheles, pianist
Eduard Nápravník, conductor
Václav Neumann, conductor
Jaromír Nohavica, guitarist and songwriter
Jarmila Novotná, opera singer
Josef Páleníček, pianist
Libor Pešek, conductor
Karel Plíhal, guitarist and songwriter
David Popper, cellist
Rudolf Serkin, pianist
Otakar Ševčík, violinist
Leo Slezak, opera singer
Jiří Stivín, flute player
Karel Strakatý, singer
Vaclav Talich, conductor
Vilém Tauský, conductor
Štěpán Rak, guitarist
Zuzana Růžičková, harpsichordist
Miroslav Vitouš, jazzman
Antonín Vranický (also known as Anton ), violinist
Hana Zagorová, singer
Wojciech Żywny, pianist

Filmmakers
See Czech Film Directors
František Čáp, film director
Věra Chytilová, film director
Miloš Forman, film director
Karl Freund, film director
Jan Hřebejk, film director
Jaromil Jireš, film director
Elmar Klos, film director
Oldřich Lipský, film director, screenwriter
Jiří Menzel, film director, actor
Zdeněk Miler, film director
Georg Wilhelm Pabst, film director 
Ivan Passer, film director
Jan Pinkava, animator, film director
Břetislav Pojar, film director
Alfréd Radok, film and theatre director
Emil Radok, film director
Karel Reisz, film director
Bohdan Sláma, film director
Ladislav Smoljak, film director
Jan Švankmajer, film director, animator
Jan Svěrák, film director, actor
Jan Tománek, film director, artist and writer
Jiří Trnka, film director, animator
Zdeněk Troška, film director, screenwriter
Hermína Týrlová, stage designer, cartoonist
Otakar Vávra, film director
František Vláčil, film director
Karel Zeman, film director, animator

Military
Jan Kubiš, paratrooper, the assassination of Heydrich
Jozef Gabčík, paratrooper, the assassination of Heydrich (Slovak)
Josef Bryks, pilot
Josef Alexej Eisenberger, World War II general
Alois Eliáš, army officer, member of the Czechoslovak legion
Josef František, pilot ace
Radola Gajda, army officer, member of the Czechoslovak legion
Kurt Knispel, German Tank Ace (Sudeten German)
Karel Kuttelwascher, general, pilot ace
František Moravec, military intelligence officer, member of the Czechoslovak legion in World War I
František Peřina, pilot ace
Prokop the Great, Hussite leader
Joseph Radetzky von Radetz, field marshal
Ludvík Svoboda, general, president
Jan Syrový, general, prime minister, member of the Czechoslovak legion
Albrecht von Wallenstein, warlord during Thirty Years' War
Jan Žižka, Hussite leader
Otakar Jaroš, army officer during World War II
Karel Klapálek, army officer during World War II, commander of the Czechoslovak 11th Infantry Battalion and 1st Czechoslovak Army Corps
Zdeněk Kašpar Kaplíř of Sulevice, field marshal of the austrian army, commander of austrian garrison in Siege of Vienna (1683)
Alois Podhajský, field marshal of the austro-hungarian army in the World War I
Josef Šnejdárek, soldier of French Foreign Legion, commender of the Czechoslovak army and Czechoslovak legion
František Hag, commander-in-chief of the Black Army of Hungary, former member of Hussites

Models
See Czech models
Tereza Fajksová (born 1989)
Eva Herzigová (born 1973)
Karolína Kurková (born 1984)
Tereza Maxová (born 1971)
Petra Němcová (born 1979)
Daniela Peštová (born 1970)
Pavlína Pořízková (born 1965)
Alena Šeredová (born 1978)
Hana Soukupová (born 1985)
Ivana Trump (born 1949)
Veronika Vařeková (born 1977)

Painters
See Czech Painters
Mikoláš Aleš
Petr Brandl
Václav Brožík
Ota Bubeníček
Zdeněk Burian
Josef Čapek
Antonin Chittussi
Alén Diviš
Emil Filla
Václav Hollar
Stanislav Holý
Jan Jakub Quirin Jahn
František Kaván
Karel Klíč, inventor of photogravure
Jiří Kolář
Jan Konůpek
Ludvík Kuba
Alfred Kubin
Otakar Kubín
Jan Kupecký
František Kupka
Josef Lada
Martin Mainer
Josef Mánes
Julius Edvard Marak
Mikuláš Medek
Anton Raphael Mengs
Alfons Mucha
Josef Navrátil
Emil Orlik
Jaro Procházka
Václav Vavřinec Reiner
Teodor Rotrekl
Otakar Sedloň
Karel Škréta
Antonín Slavíček
Václav Špála
Eva Švankmajerová
Theodoric of Prague
Toyen (Marie Čermínová)
Vladimír Vašíček
Helena Zmatlíková
Jan Zrzavý

Philosophers
See Czech philosophers
Václav Bělohradský (born 1944)
Arnošt Bláha (1879–1960), sociologist
Egon Bondy (1930–2007)
Václav Černý (1905–1987)
Petr Chelčický  (c.1390–c.1460)
Herbert Feigl (1902–1988)
Vilém Flusser (1920–1991) 
Ernest Gellner (1925–1995)
Edmund Husserl (1859–1938)
Jerome of Prague (1379–1416)
Karl Kautsky (1854–1938)
Hans Kelsen (1881–1973)
František Klácel (1808–1882)
Ladislav Klíma (1878–1928)
Jan Amos Komenský (1592–1670)
Karel Kosík (1926–2003)
Jan Patočka (1907–1977)
Emanuel Rádl (1873–1942)
Radovan Richta (1924–1983)

Photographers
See Czech photographers
Rudolf Bruner-Dvořák
František Drtikol
Jaromír Funke
Josef Koudelka
Antonin Kratochvil
Frank Plicka
Jan Saudek
Alexander Seik
Ladislav Sitenský
Josef Sudek
Miroslav Tichý

Politicians

Madeleine Albright, first female United States Secretary of State in U.S. history
Ivana Bacik, Irish law professor and politician of Czech descent
Edvard Beneš, president of Czechoslovakia from 1935 to 1938 and again from 1945 to 1948
Jerzy Buzek, prime Minister of Poland from 1997 to 2001
Charles IV, King of Bohemia and Holy Roman Emperor
Karl von Czyhlarz, Czech-Austrian jurist
Klement Gottwald, first communist president
Emil Hácha, president during the German occupation
Václav Havel, first president after the fall of communism, first president of the independent Czech Republic
Milada Horáková, politician anad activist hanged by the Communists
Otto Jelinek, former Canadian Federal Cabinet Minister
Václav Klaus, former prime minister and expresident of the Czech Republic
Juscelino Kubitschek, President of Brazil (1956–1961)
Jan Masaryk, foreign minister
Tomáš G. Masaryk, first president of Czechoslovakia
Mikuláš of Hus, politician, Hussite
Emanuel Moravec, collaborator with Nazis
Antonín Novotný, communist president
Přemysl Otakar II, King of Bohemia and most powerful man in middle Europe in his era
George of Poděbrady, Hussite king
Karl Renner, Austrian first President after World War II 
Rudolf II, King of Bohemia and Holy Roman Emperor
Adolf Schärf, President of Austria
Jan Švejnar, US-based, Czech-born economist
Ludvík Svoboda, communist president
Mirek Topolánek, former Prime Minister
Wenceslas I, Duke of Bohemia (Saint Wenceslas, Václav), known as "Good King Wenceslas" in a Christmas carol
Wenceslaus IV of Bohemia, king
Miloš Zeman, first directly elected president in Czech history

Religion
Josef Beran, cardinal
Petr Chelčický, thinker, religious reformer
Tomáš Halík, catholic theologian, sociologist
Jan Hus, religious thinker and reformer
Judah Loew ben Bezalel, Talmudic scholar
Tomáš Špidlík, cardinal, thinker
František Tomášek, cardinal

Saints
Saint Adalbert of Prague (Vojtěch in Czech), bishop of Prague, missionary and martyr
Saint Agnes of Bohemia, Anežka Česká
Saint John of Nepomuk, known through central Europe
Saint John Neumann (John Nepomucene Neumann)
Saint John Sarkander, priest tortured to death in Olomouc
Saint Ludmila, princess of Bohemia, grandmother of St. Wenceslas
Saint Prokop, canon and hermit
Saint Wenceslas, duke of Bohemia
Saint Gorazd (Pavlík), Eastern Orthodox new martyr, bishop of Prague, and metropolitan of the Czech lands and Slovakia

Sculptors
See Czech sculptors
Franta Bělský
Břetislav Benda
František Bílek
Matthias Bernard Braun
Ferdinand Maxmilian Brokoff
Jan Brokoff
Michael Joseph Brokoff
Alfréd Hrdlička
Bohumil Kafka
Vincenc Makovský
Josef Václav Myslbek
Zoja Trofimiuk
Lea Vivot
Vladimir Winkler
Ladislav Zívr
Olbram Zoubek

Scientists
See Czech Scientists

Karel Absolon, archaeologist and speleologist
Josef Augusta, paleontologist and popularizer of science
Jiří Baborovský, chemist
Jindřich Bačkovský, physicist
Jan Bašta, engineer and researcher
Eugen Böhm von Bawerk, economist
František Běhounek, radiologist, writer, and explorer
Vincent Bochdalek, anatomist
Johann Böhm, chemist
Bernard Bolzano, mathematician, philosopher, and theologian
Otakar Borůvka, mathematician
Josef Božek engineer
Eduard Čech, mathematician
František Čelakovský, linguist and writer
Václav Cílek, geologist and popularizer of science
Jan Amos Comenius, polyhistorian, educator, and the inventor of illustrated textbooks
Gerty Cori, biochemist and Nobel Prize laureate
Carl Ferdinand Cori, biochemist and Nobel Prize laureate
Leander Czerny, biologist
Václav Prokop Diviš, priest, scientist and inventor
Josef Dobrovský, philologist and historian
Karel Fortyn, physician
Sigmund Freud, psychologist
František Josef Gerstner, physicist and engineer
Kurt Gödel, mathematician
Stanislav Grof, psychologist and researcher in transpersonal psychology
Peter Grünberg, physicist and Nobel Prize in Physics laureate
Jiří Grygar, astrophysicist, popularizer of science
Jan Hajek, scientist
Jaroslav Hájek, mathematician
Tadeáš Hájek, physician and astronomer
Lumír Ondřej Hanuš, chemist, co-discovered anandamide, an endogenous cannabinoid neurotransmitter
Ferdinand Ritter von Hebra, dermatologist
Jaroslav Heyrovský, chemist, winner of the Nobel Prize in Chemistry in 1959
Václav Hlavatý, mathematician
Ivan Honl, biologist
Kamil Hornoch, amateur astronomer
Bedřich Hrozný, linguist
Jakub Husnik, inventor and painter
Jan Janský, physician, discovered blood types
Karl Guthe Jansky, engineer
Vojtěch Jarník, mathematician
Konstantin Jireček, historian
Otto Jirovec, parasitologist and protozoologist
Georg Joseph Kamel, botanist
Vlasta Kálalová, physician and entomologist
Karel Kavina, botanist
Jan Kmenta, economist and econometrician
Luboš Kohoutek, astronomer
František Koláček, physicist
Zdenek Kopal, astronomer
František Křižík, an inventor of the arc lamp
Bohumil Kučera, physicist
Jaroslav Kurzweil, mathematician
Václav Láska, geophysicist and mathematician
Mathias Lerch, mathematician
Drahoslav Lím, chemist and the inventor of hydrogel
Johann Josef Loschmidt, chemist 
Ernst Mach, physicist and expert in aerodynamics
Frank Malina, aeronautical engineer
Jan Marek Marci, physician
Zdeněk Matějka, chemist
Gregor Mendel, founder of the science of genetics
Antonín Mrkos, astronomer
Johann Palisa, astronomer
František Patočka, biologist
Karel Petr, mathematician
Josef Ladislav Píč, archaeologist
George Placzek, physicist
Julius Pokorny, etymologist
Ferdinand Porsche, automotive engineer
Křišťan of Prachatice, medieval astronomer and physician
Petr Pravec, astronomer
Jan Svatopluk Presl, chemist
Karel Presl, botanist
Stanislaus von Prowazek, zoologist and parasitologist
Vlastimil Pták, mathematician
Jan Evangelista Purkyně, physiologist who first recognised the individuality of fingerprints
Zdeněk Rejdák, scientist in psychotronics
Josef Ludvík František Ressel, an inventor of the ship's propeller
Karel Rokytanský, anatomist
Karel Rychlík, mathematician
Vojtěch Šafařík, chemist
Jaroslav Šafránek, physicist
Heinrich Wilhelm Schott, botanist
Joseph Schumpeter, economist
Bohumil Sekla, biologist
Alois Senefelder, inventor of the printing technique of lithography
August Seydler, physicist and astronomer
Ota Šik, economist
Jan Šindel, astronomer
Josef Škoda, physician
Ferdinand Stoliczka, paleontologist
Vincenc Strouhal, physicist
František Josef Studnička, mathematician
Antonín Svoboda, computer scientist and mathematician
Karl von Terzaghi, geotechnical engineer and geologist
Olga Taussky-Todd, mathematician
Jana Tichá, astronomer
Miloš Tichý, astronomer
Viktor Trkal, physicist and mathematician
Miloslav Valouch, mathematician
Petr Vopěnka, mathematician
Jindřich Wankel, paleontologist
Rudolf Weigl, biologist
Max Wertheimer, psychologist
Otto Wichterle, chemist and the inventor of the modern contact lens
Karel Zahradnik, mathematician
Rudolf Zahradník, chemist
František Záviška, physicist
John Zeleny, physicist and the inventor of the electroscope
Vladimír Zoubek, geologist
Petr Zuman, electrochemist

Linguistics, anthropology, history
Guido Adler, musicologist
Bohuslav Balbín, historian
Max Dvořák, art historian
Eva Hajičová, linguist
Eduard Hanslick, musicologist
Aleš Hrdlička, medical doctor, anthropologist
Bedřich Hrozný, philologist and orientalist (decipherer of Hittite)
Konstantin Jireček, slavist, historian
Josef Jungmann, linguist
Henry Kučera, linguist, cognitive scientist, language software author
Bohumil Mathesius, translator
Vilém Mathesius, linguist
Josef Vratislav Monse, founder of Moravian history-writing
Jan Mukařovský, literary theorist
Alois Musil, orientalist, explorer
František Palacký, historian
Antonín Rezek, historian
František Roubík, historian
August Sedláček, historian
Petr Sgall, linguist
Čeněk Zíbrt, ethnographer, historian

Sports personalities

Entrepreneurs
Jan Antonín Baťa, industrialist (Baťa a.s., Zlin, Bata Tires, Fatra, Kotva, FAB Zlin (film industry) at Kudlov, ZLAS (Aircraft Otrokovice), ZPA Zlin, ChemoSvit, TatraSvit, Zlin Magazine, founded towns of Batovany (Partizanske), Svit, Batov (Otrokovice))
Tomáš Baťa, industrialist (Bata T&A, Zlin)
Emil Kolben, industrialist (ČKD)
František Křižík, industrialist 
Ignác Šechtl, pioneer of photography (Šechtl and Voseček)
Emil Škoda, industrialist (Škoda Works)

Other
Karel Barvitius, book and music publisher
Eliška Bučková, Miss Universe 2008 Top 15 finalist (Czech Republic placed for the second consecutive time)
Jiří Buquoy, aristocrat
Vlaada Chvatil, board game designer 
Tereza Fajksová (Miss Earth 2012) 
Josef Florian, book publisher
Zdenek Konvalina, ballet dancer
Marian Korn (1914–1987), printmaker  
Taťána Kuchařová (Miss World 2006)  
Victor Lustig, con artist
Iveta Lutovská, Miss Universe 2009 Top 10 finalist (Czech Republic placed for the third consecutive time)
Jaroslav Malina, theatre scenographer
Jan Opletal, student, shot by Germans
Jan Palach, student, political activist
Přemek Podlaha, TV personality
Zdeňka Pokorná, teacher and political activist
Vladimír Remek, cosmonaut
Silvie Tomčalová, aka Silvia Saint, adult film star
Oskar Schindler, industrialist who saved 1200 Jewish lives in World War 2.
Bertha von Suttner, Nobel Peace Prize laureate
Jan Zajíc, student, political activist, suicide

Fictional characters

Jára Cimrman, fictional character of universal talents
Josef Švejk, fictional soldier in World War I, main character of Jaroslav Hašek's novel The Good Soldier Švejk
Tomas Vrbada, also known as Smoke, from the Mortal Kombat game series
Mole
Pat & Mat

See also
 List of Czech Jews
 List of people by nationality

References

Czechs